The Hobart Interchange (also colloquially referred to as the Hobart Bus Mall) is a section of Elizabeth Street that serves as Metro Tasmania's primary bus terminus in Hobart's CBD. It is utilised by thousands of commuters every day, bringing city workers into Hobart from outlying suburbs, and the neighbouring cities of Clarence and Glenorchy, as well as nearby Richmond, Cambridge and Kingborough. The mall is the section of Elizabeth Street, located between Macquarie Street, and Collins Street. There are also several stops located in nearby Franklin Square.

Upgrades
In 2015, the Hobart City Council announced a $2 million upgrade to the mall.
The upgrades include double the sheltered space, 3-meter-wide pedestrian footpaths, additional seating, improved lighting and bike racks.
Commencing in 2017, work on the upgrades was divided into multiple stages as a means to minimalise disrupting services and the bus mall reopened in October 2020.

References

External links
Metro Tasmania
Hobart Bus Station Map

Bus stations in Australia
Transport in Hobart
Buildings and structures in Hobart